Legonmycin is a compound that belongs to the pyrrolizidine backbone of naturally occurring alkaloids. Discovered by a joint team of  researchers from University of Ghana, University of Aberdeen and Wuhan University, the compound was isolated from microorganisms at Legon (a suburb of Accra), and occurs in two forms; Legonmycin A and Legonmycin B.

References

Aminoglycoside antibiotics
Pyrrolizidine alkaloids
Medicinal chemistry
Pharmacology